Jonas Pleškys (March 10, 1935 – April 14, 1993) was a Soviet Navy barge captain who defected from the Soviet Union to the United States in April 1961. As a captain of a barge, he directed his vessel to Gotland, Sweden, where he asked for political asylum. The crew and the barge were returned to the Soviet Union. His defection served as an inspiration for Tom Clancy's book The Hunt for Red October.

Biography

Early life
Pleškys was born on 10 March 1935 in near Tverai in western Lithuania to a family of landless peasants. The family had 17 children, but only seven reached adulthood. One of his sisters was actress Eugenija Pleškytė. Pleškys' mother died of tuberculosis in 1946 and his father married a woman who before the war owned  of land. It was likely sufficient to label the family as "bourgeoisie". The step-mother's family also had connections with the Lithuanian partisans. As such, Pleškys' parents were deported to Siberia during the Operation Vesna in May 1948. Pleškys and two siblings were also taken, but their father managed to push them out of the moving train. In 1952, Pleškys was expelled from a pedagogical school in Telšiai due to writing down anti-Soviet statements during a class.

Pleškys then continued his education at the Telšiai Gymnasium and joined the Lithuanian Komsomol. He received excellent grades, but was not admitted to the Kaunas Polytechnic Institute likely because his deported parents made him "politically unreliable". In 1954, he was conscripted to serve in the Soviet Navy. After nine-month courses in Leningrad, Pleškys was admitted to the higher submarine courses in Leningrad. He graduated in June 1959 as a submarine navigator. Pleškys briefly served in a submarine before reassignment as captain to an auxiliary vessel collecting waste fuel from marine engines. Pleškys received the rank of lieutenant.

Defection
In early 1961, Pleškys married Zoja Rozenkranc who was already pregnant with their daughter Sondra. On April 6, 1961, upon learning that his vessel would be transferred from Klaipėda to Paldiski in Estonian SSR, Pleškys directed his barge Smolny north to dump the collected waste fuel in neutral waters of the Baltic Sea. The ship had nine crew members. By Liepāja, Pleškys changed course directly towards Gotland, an island of Sweden. Due to stormy weather, the crew was unaware of the changed course. When the barge reached the shores of Gotland, Pleškys ordered to fire flares to indicate request for help. They were met by coastguards. Pleškys indicated that he wanted to defect and asked for political asylum and suggested Kryžiokas do the same, but he refused. 

The next day, three Swedish ships escorted Smolny to Slite. Personnel of the Russian embassy, including military attaché , arrived to deal with the matter. The crew discovered that Smolny's compass and navigational charts were destroyed. The vessel was assigned a new captain and departed Gotland on April 8. In neutral waters, Smolny was met by a Soviet minesweeper which replaced the entire crew of Smolny and returned the vessel to Liepāja.

Later life
The military tribunal of the Baltic Fleet sentenced Pleškys in absentia to execution on August 29, 1961. He spent the rest of life afraid that the KGB was coming after him.

Pleškys was picked up by the CIA and debriefed to ensure that he was not a double agent working for the KGB. What is known about his later life is still very fragmentary as CIA files concerning Pleškys remain classified. Eventually, he received a U.S. passport under the name Jonas Plaskus. At various times, he was at a submarine repair docks, taught basics of computer programing at the University of Washington, worked at a bank in San Francisco. In 1968, he enrolled into the International Language School to study Spanish. There he met Laura Cajas de Martinez and they married the same year. They had daughter Jennifer Plaskus and the marriage lasted five years. 

For five years, he traveled to various countries. In 1972–1973, he worked under contract with the United States Agency for International Development (USAID) in Guatemala and Costa Rica. He briefly returned to the United States and worked as a computer programmer. In 1979, he disappeared and spent three years growing his own food and living in a remote cabin in Mexico. According to his biographer Marijona Venslauskaitė-Boyle, it was the only place where he felt safe from the KGB. In 1986, Pleškys returned to the United States and got a job as a systems management specialist with the American President Companies in Oakland. In 1988, he met his sister actress Eugenija Pleškytė in Houston when she toured with her theater troupe. The KGB approved her travels hoping they could track her brother through her. 

In 1990, he was diagnosed with a brain tumor. That year Lithuania declared independence. The Supreme Court of Lithuania vacated his death sentence in 1992 which allowed Pleškys to briefly return to Lithuania and meet his daughter Sondra for the first time. He died on April 14, 1993 in Oakland, California.

Legacy
Pleškys' defection was one of two incidents that inspired Tom Clancy in his writing of The Hunt for Red October. The other was the 1975 mutiny aboard the Soviet frigate Storozhevoy.

In 2005, Marijona Venslauskaitė-Boyle, who knew Pleškys in his last years, published Search For Freedom: The Man From Red October about his life.

See also
 The Defection of Simas Kudirka, a drama film based on the attempted defection by a Lithuanian merchant seaman
 List of Eastern Bloc defectors

References

Further reading

1935 births
1993 deaths
Lithuanian military personnel
Soviet defectors to the United States
Soviet Navy officers
Lithuanian emigrants to the United States
People sentenced to death in absentia by the Soviet Union